Azuragrion vansomereni is a species of damselfly in family Coenagrionidae. It is found in Cameroon, Ivory Coast, Ethiopia, Gambia, Ghana, Nigeria, Senegal, Sudan, Togo, Uganda, and possibly Angola. Its natural habitats are dry savanna, moist savanna, subtropical or tropical dry shrubland, subtropical or tropical moist shrubland, subtropical or tropical dry lowland grassland, freshwater marshes, and intermittent freshwater marshes.

References

Coenagrionidae
Insects described in 1956
Taxonomy articles created by Polbot